Dory is a fictional blue tang and a major character of the American animated film series Finding Nemo. She suffers from the disability short-term memory-loss, which often causes frustration to Marlin, especially while his son Nemo is in danger. However, her childlike optimism and ability to communicate different languages from both humans and whales have helped both her and Marlin advance their quest to find Nemo.

The character is voiced by Ellen DeGeneres, and by Jennifer Hale in tie-in media from video games to theme park attractions. Various merchandise of the character have also been produced, including action figures and toys produced for McDonald's Happy Meals.

Production history

Casting 
Dory was initially supposed to be a male character during the pre-production of the film. Andrew Stanton admits to struggling with a writing block upon the character. That was until he overheard his wife watching an episode of the sitcom Ellen. Stanton was impressed with Ellen DeGeneres' ability to speak many different subjects within a few minutes, thus leading to the casting of DeGeneres. Upon the production of Finding Nemo, Ellen DeGeneres brought concerns upon the producers of the film due to the comedian potentially lacking the ability to cue dramatic lines and performances. Upon the first take of Dory's speech for Marlin to not leave her, Ellen's first trial takes was deemed so emotionally rich that the producers would keep said take in the film. DeGeneres would credit Stanton for producing the character with her personality in mind, particularly for her motto 'Just keep swimming', which is a philosophy that DeGeneres considers core to her own character, particularly when her sitcom Ellen was cancelled by ABC.

Appearances

Finding Nemo 

Dory first appears in the film when she accidentally bumps into a panicked Marlin chasing after a diver that captured his son, Nemo. Dory quickly apologizes and checks on the well-being of Marlin. While Marlin panics about losing the diver's boat, Dory recalls seeing such a boat and offers Marlin to follow her direction towards the boat. Unknowingly to Marlin, Dory forgets her objective and flees from Marlin thinking he is stalking her. After Dory yells at Marlin to stop following her, Marlin confusingly tells her about the boat, and Dory repeats the same offer. In annoyance, Marlin tells Dory she told him about the boat's direction. Dory apologizes and reveals she has short-term memory-loss. She offers help, but Marlin rejects it and goes his way to find his son.

A great white shark named Bruce invites Marlin and Dory to a shark club in a submarine wreck that vows itself to view fish as friends, not food. Dory without suspicion follows the same pledge the sharks have made. Marlin attempts to retrieve a mask to read its address but fails to understand human writing. Dory attempts to read it, but Marlin fights to keep the mask to himself. Marlin accidentally releases the mask's strap onto Dory, which causes her to bleed. The blood causes Bruce to kick into his natural instinct, and he attempts to eat Marlin and Dory. While fleeing, Dory manages to partly understand "escape" on an emergency exit. Surprising Marlin, he would rush Dory to read the mask before being confronted by Bruce. The two flee into a torpedo cannon with the mask now in Bruce's mouth. While trapped, Dory would fire the torpedo towards Bruce's mouth, to which she and Marlin retrieve the mask. Bruce spits the torpedo away, which accidentally explodes an entire minefield, which everyone flees from.

In the aftermath of the explosion, Marlin and Dory flee from a falling submarine while losing the mask. Oblivious to the mask, Dory gleefully swims into the abyss and back upward to see Marlin panicked about losing the mask. Marlin blames Dory for losing the mask, but Dory attempts to cheer him up with a song as they swim downward into the abyss to find the mask. Dory confuses herself in the darkness and Marlin attempts to calm her down. The two would then encounter an anglerfish baiting them with its bioluminescent antenna. The anglerfish attempts to eat them, but Dory manages to escape and find the mask. She memorizes the address "P Sherman 42 Wallaby Way, Sydney" just before the anglerfish chasing Marlin runs into the mask. The two would surface upward.

Marlin attempts to talk to a school of moonfish as Dory gleefully swims and celebrates being able to memorize the address. The moonfish fleeing from Marlin makes him blame Dory again and asks her to leave, causing Dory to cry. The moonfish belittle Marlin and attempt to cheer Dory up by getting her to guess several sea animals that the school morphs into. Marlin angrily tries to leave, with Dory asking about his issues. Marlin rants about his circumstances in his quest to find his son, only for Dory to remind him she is helping him. She'd then ask the moonfish for directions towards Sydney, to which they tell her and Marlin where to go. Before they venture in their direction, the moonfish tell Dory to go through an upcoming trench as opposed to over it. The trench has a frightening appearance, which leaves Marlin fearful. Dory insists on following the moonfish school's orders, but Marlin takes advantage of her childlike personality and leads her over the trench by telling her there's a shiny object. This would result in the two trapped in a school of jellyfish. Marlin would persuade Dory to a game of race to escape the jellyfish school. Forgetting about the safety of Dory, Marlin has to save Dory from the school of Jellyfish, to which both are left stung immensely.

A turtle named Crush would rescue the two fish. Dory would be seen playing hide and seek with Crush's children. After Marlin explaining his quest to find his son, Crush's son Squirt, would push Marlin and Dory to their nearest location to Sydney from the East Australian Current. As Dory and Marlin quest, Dory would play a game of guess to Marlin, to which all of the questions were related to him. Marlin panics that the two weren't going anywhere, so Dory calms him down. They then meet a silhouette figure resembling a fish. Marlin warns Dory about its dangers, but Dory would eventually be able to ask for more directions where Sydney is. The figure makes whale calls, which leads to Dory mimicking its sounds. It catches the attention of the figure, which reveals itself to be a giant whale that swallows both Dory and Marlin up.

Marlin attempts to break through the whale's baleen, but Dory is seen gleefully swimming, oblivious that they're inside a whale. Marlin sobbingly sinks to the bottom of the whale's mouth after failing to break the baleen, which gets Dory to comfort Marlin and motivate him that they will find Nemo. Dory would ask the whale about what it's doing, which then leads the whale to lift its tongue up. As Marlin and Dory hang onto the up-right tongue, Dory attempts to communicate to the whale, which infuriates Marlin into shouting at her. Dory would then let go of the whale's tongue after hearing the whale vocalize, which leads Marlin to grab her. Dory tells Marlin the whale is asking them to let go, Marlin asks Dory how she knows anything bad wouldn't happen, Dory responds that she's uncertain. Reluctantly, Marlin lets go of the whale's tongue, which then leads to the two being blown outside the whale through a blowhole. It's revealed that the whale transported the two to Sydney, and that Dory did in fact understand whale language.

Marlin and Dory are then swooped up by a hungry pelican, Gerald, to which they escape. Gerald's friend, Nigel, knows about Nemo and offers a ride to both Marlin and Dory as they're attempting to flee. Nigel swiftly picks up the two after a swarm of seagulls attempt to eat the fish. Nigel escapes the seagulls and manages to find the exact address Dory remembered. It's revealed that the diver, a dentist, thinks that Nemo passed away and tries to throw him away before Marlin forces Nigel into the room. After a scuffle with the dentist, Marlin and Dory fearfully see Nemo's body upside down, which is then interrupted as the dentist successfully gets Nigel to leave the dentist room. Nigel apologizes about the loss of Nemo, which leads Marlin to gloomfully thank Dory for her help while attempting to leave. Dory pleads Marlin to not leave her and keep her as a friend, especially after being alone for much of her life. She thanks Marlin for being able to remember better and tells him that she doesn't want to forget. Marlin regretfully tells Dory he wants to forget the entire journey, and thus heads back to his anemone. 

Dory panics in loneliness, until she eventually discovers a juvenile clownfish in search of his father. After reading a logo on a pipe, Dory remembers the original address on the scuba mask and realizes the clownfish is Nemo. She meets up with crabs to ask where Marlin is, which they refuse to tell. Dory grabs one of the crabs and threatens to feed it to seagulls, which causes the crab to immediately tell her and Nemo where Marlin went. Dory returns Nemo to a now ecstatic Marlin in a brief reunion, which is then interrupted by a fishing net catching schools of grouper and Dory herself. Nemo insists Marlin that the groupers must swim down to save Dory. Marlin repeats Dory's song to the groupers as they swim downward, freeing them all from the net. Nemo was injured after the net fell down but gets back up after Marlin tells him about his and Dory's adventure. Dory is eventually guided to Marlin and Nemo's reef by Bruce and his shark club, to which she agreed to be a part of. As Nemo goes to school, Dory waves Nemo goodbye alongside Marlin.

Finding Dory 

In a flashback, a baby Dory is seen learning from her parents Jenny and Charlie. It then cuts back to periodic episodes of Dory aging as she attempts to find her parents. She would ask multiple fish until she'd gradually forgot her parents due to her short-term memory loss. The flashback ends with Dory discovering Marlin to then start the adventure of the first film.

One year after meeting Marlin and Nemo, Dory is living with them in their reef. She'd serve as a teacher assistant to Nemo's teacher, Mr. Ray. During a field trip, Dory has a flashback about her parents, only to be swept away by a school of eagle rays. After a brief mention by Nemo over Morro Bay, California, Dory seeks a quest to the area in search of her parents.

Crush the sea turtle would guide Dory, Marlin, and Nemo through the California Current for their destination. Upon close arrival, they explore a shipwreck full of lost cargo, where Dory accidentally awakens a giant Humboldt squid while attempting to call for her parents. The squid pursues them and almost devours Nemo. They manage to trap the squid in a large shipping container, and Marlin berates Dory for endangering them, saddening Dory. Upon hearing the voice of Sigourney Weaver through an aquarium loudspeaker, she'd surface to seek help where she is captured by aquarium staff to be relocated at the trio's nearby destination, the Marine Life Institute.

Dory is placed in quarantine and tagged. There she meets a grouchy seven-legged octopus named Hank. Dory's tag marks her for transfer to an aquarium in Cleveland, Ohio. Hank, who fears being released back into the ocean, agrees to help Dory find her parents in exchange for her tag. In one exhibit, Dory encounters her childhood friend Destiny, a nearsighted whale shark, who used to communicate with Dory through pipes, and Bailey, a beluga whale, who mistakenly believes he has lost his ability to echolocate. Dory subsequently has flashbacks of life with her parents while Hank attempts to locate Dory to her former aquarium habitat. Those flashbacks include how she learned her motto "just keep swimming" and her interest in shells. Her short-term-memory-loss often causes frustration to Hank due to quest prolonging Hank's desires of going to Cleveland, which makes him threaten Dory to take away her tag. After a day's worth of searching for Dory's habitat, Hank would finally bring Dory to her destination, and Dory would give Hank the tag to Cleveland. While in the habitat, Dory notices her parents are gone, which reminds her why she went lost in the first place. In a flashback Dory hears her mother crying in fears of being relocated to another aquarium, so she left to retrieve a shell to cheer her up, to which she was pulled away by an undertow current out into the ocean.

After being told by a hermit crab that her species was being held in the aquarium's quarantine, Dory would go through the same pipe that swept her away, to which she would eventually reunite with Marlin and Nemo searching for her. Destiny and Bailey would attempt to guide the trio into the aquarium's quarantine, which the other blue tangs tell them that Dory's parents escaped from the institute a long time ago to search for her, only for them to never come back. This startles Dory to believe that they have died. Hank retrieves Dory from the tank while confused on if Dory reunited with her parents as the blue tangs and clownfish are loaded in a truck to be relocated to Cleveland. He is then apprehended by one of the employees and unintentionally drops Dory into the drain, flushing her out to the ocean. While wandering aimlessly, she comes across a trail of shells; remembering that when she was young, her parents had set out a similar trail to help her find her way back home, she follows it. At the end of the trail, Dory finds an empty brain coral with multiple shell trails leading to it. As she turns to leave, her parents arrive. Ecstatic with emotions, the family is happy to see each other again. Dory would apologize for her disability, to which her parents dismiss by telling Dory it was her unique personality that got them reunited in the first place. They also tell her they spent years laying down the trails for her to follow in the hopes that she would eventually find them.

Dory remembers that Nemo, Marlin, and Hank were being transported to Cleveland and goes to seek help to bring her friends back in the ocean. Destiny and Bailey escape from their exhibit to help Dory rescue her friends on the truck. Once onboard the truck, Dory persuades Hank to return to the sea with her, and together, they hijack the truck and drive it over busy highways, creating havoc, before crashing it into the sea, freeing all the fish. Dory along with her parents and friends, return to the reef. Hank begins to adapt a happy lifestyle in the ocean and also becomes a substitute teacher for Nemo's school as Mr. Ray goes on migration. Dory would then go to the same drop-off that Nemo got captured to gaze at the open ocean. Marlin, fearing for Dory's safety, would follow Dory to the drop-off. Overcoming his fears, Marlin would then praise Dory for her accomplishments in finding her parents as they together gaze at the ocean.

Environmental impact
Dory has popularized her species, the blue tang, among fish owners and aquarists after the release of Finding Nemo. Despite the popularity, all blue tangs in captivity are wild-caught, leading to concerns of overfishing for the pet-trade. In-line with the release of Finding Dory, the University of Florida's Tropical Aquaculture Laboratory managed to successfully breed blue tangs in human care. Despite hopes of reaching mainstream accessibility, this form of care is currently not available to public aquarists.

Reception

From a general viewer's perspective, Dory is often regarded as the most defining character of the Finding Nemo franchise. Her cheerful and ditsy personality proved to be popular, especially during comedic moments such as trying to talk to a whale to route her and Marlin to Sydney. There has also been praise for her sympathetic traits, particularly when she attempts to sympathize with a depressed Marlin before he leaves her after failing to rescue Nemo before his supposed 'death'.

Many disability organizations have documented on the character's portrayed amnesia, particularly on how disabled individuals and their peers are represented. The Disability Visibility Project and others have praised Dory for her disability being portrayed as integral to the character as opposed to a weakness that must be overcome, as evident in how characters respond to Dory. Marlin's disapproval of Dory's child-like personality and tendency to forget has been ascribed to disabled people being an inconvenience to their peers, and despite this, Marlin and Dory stick to their main objective of finding Nemo despite their conflicting personalities. Dory's concern of her disability objecting herself is put down by her parents telling her that it was her actions and character that define who she is as a person.  Although Dory has anterograde amnesia, organizations such as Autism Awareness and Duke Chronicle have likened her personality and characteristics to people exhibiting traits of autism or ADHD. Examples include Dory being unaware of basic social cues being akin to autism, her fixation on specific tasks such as translating a mask's writing being akin to ADD. The Society for Disability Studies described Dory's disability as being a core element of her character as a progressive representation in mainstream animation, but also noted her peers describing her abilities as a person among her disability as a traditional portrayal that a character is overcoming a disability.
 
For her initial performance, DeGeneres would win the Saturn Award for Best Supporting Actress and get a nomination from the Chicago Film Critics Association Award for Best Supporting Actress.

In 2016, DeGeneres would get a nomination for best voice performance from the Washington D.C. Area Film Critics Association Awards.

References

Finding Nemo
Fictional fish
Pixar characters
Film characters introduced in 2003
Female characters in animated films
Fictional characters with amnesia
Animated characters introduced in 2003
Ellen DeGeneres